Phey Yew Kok (born 1934) is a former Singaporean politician and union leader. He was the Member of Parliament for Boon Teck constituency from 1972 to 1980 and the President of the National Trades Union Congress from 1970 to 1980. He was convicted in 2016 for charges of misuse of union funds laid against him in 1979. He was on the run for 35 years before surrendering to Singapore authorities in 2015.

Early life and education 
Phey was born in 1934. He was educated in a Chinese stream secondary school before switching to an English stream secondary school. He also had also studied accountancy at the Singapore Technical Institute, while teaching at a primary school.

Career 
Phey started working in the Malaysia-Singapore Airlines (MSA) as an accounts clerk. While working at MSA, Phey began to suffer from hearing loss due to him working at the airport where there was high levels of noise. When he was promoted to be a planning officer in the production and planning department of MSA, he joined its union, Singapore Air Transport Union (SATU) and was elected into SATU's executive committee in 1960. He subsequently held the treasurer post in SATU in 1966, and finally the president position in 1968. Devan Nair took notice of him  in 1969, and under Devan's mentorship, Phey also became the General Secretary of two other prominent unions, Singapore Industrial Labour Organisation (SILO) and Pioneer Industries Employees' Union (PIEU) by 1970. Phey also became the president of National Trades Union Congress (NTUC) in the same year. By then, he was also promoted into the planning division of Singapore Airlines, the Singapore successor of MSA. 

In November 1969, Phey was slashed in the thigh while exiting from the Union House located on Beng Wan Road. On 21 July 1970, he was again slashed by four men over union infighting at Stirling Road, which left him a 7.5 cm scar on his face.

Under Phey's leadership, SILO's membership grew exponentially, from 4,000 to 12,000 members within a year, and acquired a headquarters for $210,000 in 1971.

Phey entered into politics in the 1972 Singaporean general election under People's Action Party banner for Boon Teck constituency, and won 66.8% of the votes cast there. Phey credited his win to the fact that many in the constituency were also members of SILO and PIEU. Phey was reelected in the same constituency in the next general election in 1976, winning 71.9% of the votes cast there.

On 25 May 1979, Phey became the chairman of NTUC.

Misuse of union funds 
In 1977, an amendment to the Trade Unions Act was introduced and passed in the Parliament to limit the usage of the funds of registered trade unions to just investments in stocks and shares of companies, and with a Minister's approval. On 16 September 1978, Phey used $11,235 of SILO's funds to finance the purchase of shares of a supermarket. On 18 September 1979, he used $6,510 of PIEU's funds to purchase shares of another supermarket. Both purchases were done without approval from the Minister. In mid of 1979, the Corrupt Practices Investigation Bureau (CPIB) launched an investigation into Phey over alleged malpractices in SILO and PIEU.

On 4 December 1979, Phey tendered his resignations at SILO and PIEU. However, these were held in abeyance until he was formally dismissed from all union posts in absentia on 8 January 1980. Devan, now the president of NTUC was appointed as the acting general secretary for SILO and PIEU. 

Phey was formally charged on 10 December 1979 on two counts of the laws introduced in the 1977 amendments, over the abovementioned share purchases, and on four additional counts of criminal breach of trust. He pleaded not guilty and was placed under a $100,000 bail, pending a court hearing on 7 January 1980. However, Phey did not turn up in courts, and caused $95,000 of the bail money to be forfeited. Phey was last seen in Singapore on 31 December 1979 by his family members, and could not be contacted since then. It was widely accepted that Phey had fled the country and an arrest warrant for him was placed. His passport was not surrendered and was valid for travelling, as "there was no evidence to show that he was about to leave the country or even had the intention to do so." He was also placed on Interpol's wanted list, while his passport was cancelled. Subsequent investigations found that Phey left Singapore on 31 December 1979 for Kuala Lumpur via train, thereafter proceeded to Thailand where he disappeared. Over the years, CPIB had engaged Interpol and its affiliate countries members over the years, to look for him. CPIB officers had travelled to Thailand to look for him, and even Thai authorities had conducted raids to find Phey despite having no extradition treaty between the two countries.

In a Parliament session on 12 March 1984, it was revealed that the total money lost by the unions and union-related enterprises between 1975 and 1979 was $704,173.93. Of which, $557,864.76 had been recovered.

While on the run in Thailand, Phey worked odd jobs to support himself and had no permanent address as he had no form of identification with him. On his return, Phey was completely blind in his right eye and suffered from severe hearing impairment.

On 22 June 2015, Phey turned himself in at the Singapore Embassy in Bangkok. He pleaded guilty to 12 of 34 charges, and was sentenced to jail for a period of 60 months. The sentence was backdated to when he was first remanded on 23 June 2015. On 24 October 2019, he was placed under the Singapore Prison Service's Home Detention Scheme (HDS) after he was deemed suitable for it. HDS is a community-based scheme which allows suitable prisoners to serve the tail-end of their sentences in the community, under supervision. He completed the jail sentence on 23 October 2020, with a year of the sentence served under home detention.

Fallout 
In addition to the general secretary positions at SILO and PIEU, Phey was also removed from his directorship at the Singapore Labour Foundation and ceased to be a member of Skills Development Fund's advisory council. He was dismissed from his president post in the Singapore Amateur Boxing Association and Singapore Bus Service.

An annual popular invitational basketball tournament, in Phey's namesake, which was first held in 1976 by SATU, SILO and PIEU, was cancelled in 1980.

Phey had applied for a leave of absence from the Parliament of Singapore and it was granted on 4 January 1980. The leave revoked on 26 February 1980 as the purpose of the leave, for Phey to deal with his court cases, was no longer valid with him fleeing the country. His seat for Boon Teck constituency was vacated on 31 March 1980, deadline set by the Speaker of the Parliament, after he failed to turn up for Parliament. Despite calls for a by-election, the seat remain vacant until the 1980 Singaporean general election which was held at the end of the year.

Officials associated with Phey in the various trade unions were implicated in this case, with ten faced charges of ranging from criminal breach of trust to abetting after CPIB had conducted further investigations.

By 1982, both SILO and PIEU were broken up and restructured by a task force from NTUC into nine industrial unions. In 1984, SATU was also dissolved into three house unions.

Personal life 
Phey is married with three children, with at least two of whom are sons, Phey Teck Moh and David Phey Teck Ann.

Awards 
1971: Public Service Star

Notes

References 

1934 births
Singaporean politicians of Chinese descent
Living people
People's Action Party politicians
Members of the Parliament of Singapore
Prisoners and detainees of Singapore
Singapore Polytechnic alumni